Herbert Garrison, formerly known as Janet Garrison, Ethan F Garrison, and the President, is a fictional character and occasional antagonist on the American animated television series South Park. The character is voiced by co-creator Trey Parker and first appeared in South Parks pilot episode, "Cartman Gets an Anal Probe", which aired on August 13, 1997.

In the fictional world of South Park, Mr. Garrison is primarily depicted as a teacher, usually of the main characters' third grade class, and later, their fourth-grade class. In the earlier seasons, Garrison was usually seen wearing hand puppett named Mr. Hat that at times Garrison anthropomorphized as if he were a real person, and in one episode, was suggested to be a manifestation of Garrison's own latent homosexual feelings. The character's use of the puppet was eventually discontinued. Mr. Garrison was in part inspired by a kindergarten teacher who taught Trey Parker and who used a puppet named Mr. Hat as a teaching resource. Mr. Garrison was also inspired by a British literature professor Parker had at the University of Colorado.

The character is known to be particularly cynical, especially in comparison with the rest of South Park's adults, and he is one of the few characters the writers have break the fourth wall on the show.

In the season 9 premiere, "Mr. Garrison's Fancy New Vagina", the character undergoes a sex change operation. From this point, Herbert Garrison is referred to as Janet Garrison (or Mrs. Garrison, despite being unmarried). In the season 12 episode "Eek, a Penis!", the character undergoes another sex change operation, returning to being male.

In the season 20 episode "Oh, Jeez", Mr. Garrison is  elected as the President of the United States and would remain so until season 24. During this time, he is not referred to by name, but is exclusively called "the President" by all other characters.

Parker said he believes Mr. Garrison has become one of the most complex characters on South Park, particularly due to his ever-growing relationship with Mr. Hat and his sexuality and gender issues, stating, "He's the soap opera element to the whole series. [He] has a real story going on."

Character history

In the series, the character Mr. Garrison grew up in Arkansas and claims to have a master's degree in mechanical engineering from Denver Community College (as seen in the episode "The Entity"). Mr. Garrison is known by viewers to be sexually confused. During the entirety of the show, he has had both heterosexual and same-sex relationships (with Garrison identifying at times as a man and as a woman). Across the series, he displays myriad conflicting and ambiguous sexual identities, which he clings to exclusively for long periods of time. It is unknown what causes this, but it may have some relation to an unspecified personality disorder, which Herbert could have manifested in earlier seasons through Mr. Hat and Mr. Twig.

Garrison also reveals racist tendencies in many episodes. In the episode "Chef Goes Nanners", Mr. Hat, his puppet, was a member of the local Ku Klux Klan, which Mr. Garrison resented and insisted to Chef that he wanted nothing to do with. However, in the later episode "Here Comes the Neighborhood", he tries to get rid of the "richers" (who were all black) using Klan techniques, such as wearing their robes or burning crosses. Although throughout the episode both Mr. Garrison and the rest of the townsfolk make no reference to the "richers" being black (seemingly oblivious to the fact), in his last line of the episode, his intentions are revealed to be at least in part racist ("at least we got rid of all those damn ni....." [transition to credits]). In the season one episode "An Elephant Makes Love to a Pig", he quotes, "Genetic engineering erases all of God's mistakes, like German people". In the season 1 episode "Mr. Hankey, the Christmas Poo" and the season 7 episode "It's Christmas in Canada", he suggests that the town get rid of all the Mexicans, but Mayor McDaniels repeatedly declines to do so. Exactly why he wishes to do this has not yet been explained. These are two examples of the many instances throughout the show's history where Mr. Garrison has expressed contempt for Mexicans, though in the episode "D-Yikes", Garrison relies on Mexicans to help him in a plan to thwart Persian Nightclub owners. Despite the fact that he seems to portray racist manners, he sometimes will inform his student Eric Cartman of when the nine-year-old is doing something intolerant or offensive (as seen in "The Snuke"). As president, he even tried to prolong the COVID-19 pandemic in order to keep his campaign promise to get rid of all the Mexicans, even if it meant killing countless other people as well.

For the first three seasons, Mr. Garrison was the third-grade teacher at South Park Elementary School. He was portrayed as a closeted homosexual and was ashamed and afraid to be open about it as a result of this. He pretended to have extremely negative views on homosexuality in earlier episodes, not unlike his racism (as seen in "Big Gay Al's Big Gay Boat Ride"). Garrison constantly held a puppet known as "Mr. Hat", which he used as a sort of second, more aggressive personality, as well as for emoting his internal conflicts. It was suggested that Mr. Hat (and subsequently Mr. Twig) were manners through which Mr. Garrison could express his repressed gay feelings. Though Garrison emphatically denied he was gay and tried to completely keep it a secret, he acknowledged that Mr. Hat and Mr. Twig had homosexual fantasies. He first announced he was gay in the season four episode "4th Grade".

It has been established that Garrison has had heterosexual relationships, as with Liane Cartman, whom most of the town has had sex with at some point. Possible same-sex relationships include Stephen Stotch in "Butters' Very Own Episode", and he sought a tryst with Eric Cartman in "Cartman Joins NAMBLA", in which Garrison solicited sex from a minor in an online chat room, and after meeting him near the South Park docks for sex (only then discovering then that it was Cartman, his own student), he was charged with soliciting and subsequently told by the school to take time off from his job. In his sabbatical, Garrison wrote a romance novel that he intended to be purely heterosexual in nature; titled In the Valley of Penises, it contained 6,083 instances of the word "penis". Along with his other works, it sold well until he learned that it won the Gay Pulitzer Prize and was deemed to be "the best work of homoerotic literature since Huckleberry Finn".

At some point after the release of his book and its winning the Gay Pulitzer Prize, Garrison had a nervous breakdown and fled South Park to become a hermit, where he eventually came to terms with his gay tendencies. At this point, he openly embraced his homosexuality and informed everyone of this fact. He even went so far as to cheerfully proclaim himself a "fag" repeatedly to anyone he encountered. He was rehired by South Park Elementary but as the kindergarten teacher since his old job was then held by Ms. Choksondik. By the end of the sixth season, in the episode "The Death Camp of Tolerance", he was promoted to the fourth grade after the death of Ms. Choksondik. This was a move on the principal's part to avoid any semblance of sexual-orientation discrimination against him. However, when Garrison found that he could sue the school for substantial compensation if he were discriminated against, he attempted to be so offensive he would be fired. To that end, he abandoned his puppet counterpart in favor of a human assistant, "Mr. Slave", his personal BDSM slave and lover. He then proceeded to perform several sexually explicit homosexual acts in front of his students, including putting the class gerbil into Mr. Slave's rectum. His plan, however, did not succeed, and he was instead praised for being "courageous". It has been implied he has scatophilic tendencies in "Proper Condom Use" when the majority of sexual acts he taught to the kindergarten class involved feces or defecation. In the same episode, Chef refers to Mr. Garrison as a "complete pervert."

His changing sexual identities are a continual source of problems. Despite having declared himself gay, Garrison continued to be ashamed of it as part of his continual emotional and psychological problems. In the season three finale, "World Wide Recorder Concert", he also was in despair over the fact that his father had not sexually assaulted him as a boy, believing that he did not love his son. Garrison's father considered having sex with his son in order to save his life, but he instead had recording artist Kenny G, whom Mr. Garrison thought was his father, sexually assault him. In "An Elephant Makes Love to a Pig" as well as "Jakovasaurs", it was implied that Mr. Garrison has practiced bestiality with Cartman's pig and a pigeon, respectively.

As a teacher, Mr. Garrison is almost completely inept, regularly teaching bizarre and pointless lessons, such as showing Barnaby Jones videos to the class for eight days, asking the class "why Chubby Checker left the Beatles in 1972" or teaching the students how to tell the difference between a prostitute and a police officer. On the other hand, he will occasionally teach the children advanced subjects such as theories on evolution, Stalin, and communism. He also fails to punish Cartman for making jokes about breast cancer in "Breast Cancer Show Ever" and only punishes him when he defecates on his desk. Despite his cynical nature, he appears to genuinely enjoy his job, falling into a depression when he is fired or is suspended from teaching. He also carries a gun and badge with him in class at all times, despite being told the teachers do not carry guns.

Mrs. Garrison
In the ninth-season premiere, "Mr. Garrison's Fancy New Vagina", Garrison, unhappy with being a gay man, decides to try living as a trans woman. Following a vaginoplasty, Mr. Garrison becomes Mrs. Garrison, despite never having been established as having been married. In the episode "D-Yikes!", it is revealed that she had adopted the first name "Janet". Despite also receiving breast implants, she continues to have male-pattern baldness and a masculine voice. She often asserts her femininity, though in a somewhat unfeminine manner, including male-bashing and open proclamations of sexuality. After the sex change, she would state, "I'm not gay, I'm a woman!"

The gender transition leads to the end of her relationship with Mr. Slave, who had not been consulted before the operation and declines Mrs. Garrison's sexual overtures because of her current gender expression. Mrs. Garrison also realizes that there have been no menstrual periods after the operation, leading her to believe that she is pregnant. While attempting to have an abortion, Mrs. Garrison is told that a vaginoplasty does not result in the ability to have periods, pregnancies, or abortions because sexual reassignment surgery does not include the creation of reproductive organs. She goes to go talk with Dr. Biber and demands her genitals back, but he says that he made her scrotum into a dorsal fin for Gerald and implanted her testicles into Kyle. She finally accepts her new situation after Kyle causes her testicles to explode during a basketball game, when they were used as kneecap implants that Kyle put too much stress on. Like many veteran characters, Garrison has appeared with less frequency following "Mr. Garrison's Fancy New Vagina" but was given an important role. In the episode "Follow That Egg!", she attempts to prevent legislation granting gay citizens the right to marry after discovering that her ex-lover, Mr. Slave, is planning to marry Big Gay Al.

In the episode "Go God Go", Mrs. Garrison is ordered by the school district to teach evolution to her class. Due to her personal aversion to the concept of evolution, she deliberately presents the theory in an extremely skewed light and is subsequently replaced by another teacher, Richard Dawkins. Although Mrs. Garrison continues to inject snide and insulting remarks into Dawkins's lecture, Dawkins becomes drawn to Mrs. Garrison's masculine boldness and directness. He does not find out about Mrs. Garrison's gender history until later. They start to date and are even shown having sexual intercourse. Dawkins converts Mrs. Garrison to atheism, and they subsequently decide to eradicate all religion from the world. However, due to Mrs. Garrison's influence, there is also the belief that mere logic will not work, but one must be "a dick" about it, leading to wars about the answer to "the Great Question". During that same episode, Cartman cryogenically freezes himself so he can skip the wait to purchase a Nintendo Wii in the future. When he finally wakes, he discovers that he actually slept for 500 years, and that the entire world now embraces atheism.

In the following episode, "Go God Go XII", Cartman calls Mrs. Garrison's home from the future. Dawkins answers the phone while he and Mrs. Garrison are in the middle of having sex, and in the course of asking to talk to Mrs. Garrison, Cartman reveals that Garrison previously lived as a man. Repulsed, Dawkins runs from Mrs. Garrison's home and ends the relationship. Mrs. Garrison then returns to her own religion. It is revealed that Mrs. Garrison was the motivation that convinced Dawkins to teach atheism to the world, and now that they had broken up, the future changed again.

In the episode "D-Yikes", Mrs. Garrison starts to have lesbian relationships. After being dumped by an unnamed boyfriend, Garrison goes to the local "Curves" gym in a huff, cursing men for the entire time. It is there that she meets Allison, a lesbian who is quickly attracted to Garrison's "strong-woman" attitude. Garrison, unaware of Allison's sexual orientation or growing affection, unwittingly joins her at a lesbian bar. When Garrison discovers the truth, she is initially shocked and repulsed but quickly becomes attracted to Allison and begins a sexual relationship with her. By the end of the episode, Garrison has had sexual relationships with at least two women (including one who attempted to take over the lesbian bar earlier in the episode) and now openly identifies as lesbian.

Second sex change
In the episode "Eek, a Penis!", Mrs. Garrison becomes tired of living as a woman and wants to start living as a man again. After seeing a news report on TV about using genetic engineering to grow human body parts on mice, she pays all of her money to the laboratory to grow a penis on a mouse. The mouse escapes when she opens its cage, and throughout the episode, Mrs. Garrison looks around various places. But the penis eventually comes to her, and Mrs. Garrison completes the procedure. Upon returning to the school, he then proclaims that the key difference between anyone being male, or female is whether they can get pregnant or not. He even claims that whoever cannot make babies is a male, including infertile women. When a man tells Garrison about his wife's ovarian cancer, Garrison dismissively tells him "your wife's a dude, faggot" and that he should get tested for AIDS, indicating a return to his previous homophobic behavior. In the following episode, "Over Logging", Garrison can be seen smoking a pipe and parading around in a red smoking jacket, à la Hugh Hefner, which could indicate an attitude of "straightness". Also, in the episode "About Last Night...", he is shown to be a John McCain supporter, playing on the tendency of LGBT Americans to be more politically progressive than politically conservative. He also does not appear with the South Park gay people in "The F Word". In "200", he at first assists Stan, Kyle, and Cartman in angering Tom Cruise but also later is consulted by Cartman regarding the events of "Cartman's Mom Is Still a Dirty Slut", after Mitch Connor tells Cartman that the allegations Ms. Cartman was intersex and Cartman's father are a lie – while Garrison tries to steer Cartman away, Cartman convinces him to bring out Mr. Hat, and Mr. Hat confesses the declaration of Ms. Cartman being his father (and intersex) was fake and that Eric Cartman's real father was in the room. The episode ends with an abrupt cliff-hanger while Garrison is about to reveal the identity of Cartman's father.

After his return to the male gender, Mr. Garrison's behavior was shown to be less eccentric than before, with significantly fewer acts of deviant sexual behavior, outrageous outbursts, racism, or psychotic episodes.

Presidential campaign and presidency

In the Season 19 episode "Where My Country Gone?" however, following Principal Victoria being dismissed by the school, Garrison becomes frustrated with the recent immigration of Canadians to the town and begins to verbally bash them and declare they should leave their country, and is fired from his teaching job. He begins a political campaign to get rid of all the Canadians by "fucking them all to death," and by building a wall, in a parody of the Donald Trump presidential campaign. After discovering Canada has already built such a wall, Garrison travels to Canada and rapes the Canadian prime minister (a caricature of Donald Trump) to death. Feeling he has proven that his policies work, he decides to go to Washington, D.C. to run for president, with Caitlyn Jenner as his running mate, and is absent from subsequent episodes. The episode "Sponsored Content" features Garrison and Jenner being approached by Principal Victoria and being convinced by her to return to South Park for the remainder of the season.

Trey Parker and Matt Stone had expected the Donald Trump presidential campaign to end before the eventual election. They worried that a direct portrayal of Trump would be "dated" if the campaign ended quickly, and felt it would be more appropriate to use one of their characters in his role, having already decided Garrison would come into conflict with the new principal.

During Season 20, Garrison has received the nomination of the Republican Party and continues his campaign, still representing Donald Trump. Garrison realizes that he will be incapable of actually performing his duties as the president if he were to be elected, and tries repeatedly to sabotage his own campaign, even outright telling his audience to vote for Hillary Clinton instead of him. While his attempts are initially unsuccessful, he eventually manages to tank his poll numbers by making some inflammatory comments about women, a reference to a controversial audio recording of Trump leaking. As he attempts to tell his supporters that the election is rigged against him (also a reference to statements made by Trump), they realize that he had never intended to actually make it as far as he did and chase after him. Seeking refuge in a support group run by Randy Marsh, Randy tells Garrison that the reason people want him to be president is because J. J. Abrams has brainwashed people into liking his new Star Wars film using the Member Berries, linking the nostalgic themes of the Garrison campaign to the film's rehash of older material. After failing to destroy the Member Berries, Garrison makes a speech urging Americans to vote for Hillary Clinton in protest of the new Star Wars film.

Despite Trey Parker and Matt Stone's expectations while producing the season, Garrison is elected president anyway and brainwashed by Caitlyn Jenner, who has become brainwashed by the Member Berries herself. Upon becoming president-elect of the United States, he undergoes a transformation that gives him a toupee (solidifying the Trump comparison) and uses his newfound power to force people with whom he has had altercations (such as the new school principal who fired him and a grocery store employee who refused to allow him to double bag his groceries) to perform fellatio on him. Garrison plays a role in the season's conclusion by helping to defeat the season's other antagonists, but remains in power, flanked by member berries.

Parker and Stone had expected Hillary Clinton to be victorious in the election, and described themselves as waiting for the election to end to focus on other storylines, intending for Garrison to return to teaching, humbled by his experiences. Garrison was intended to play a role in resolving the conflict between the male and female students in his classroom that had developed over the course of the season, taking responsibility for causing their behavior. Parker and Stone were, however, forced to rewrite the season's final episodes to accommodate Garrison (and Trump) being elected as president, and felt that they could not resolve some of the season's storylines in a satisfying way as a result. During seasons 21 and 23 Garrison was consistently referred to by other characters only as "The President" in order to extend the ambiguity over whether the show was depicting the in-universe Garrison or actually representing Donald Trump.

In Season 21, while claiming he can handle societal psychology despite being informed his approval ratings are very low as depicted in the episode "Doubling Down", a desperate Garrison ends up running back to South Park after launching a nuclear weapon at Toronto that killed a million Canadians in the end of "Super Hard PCness". Garrison was absent in Season 22 with the exception of a scene in the season finale, "Bike Parade" where he was in handcuffs.

President Garrison reappears in "The Pandemic Special" episode as an antagonist who wants the virus to continue killing people, because it is also killing Mexicans. At the end of the episode, the pangolin needed to create a cure for the virus—and the doctor holding it—are burned to death by Garrison with a flamethrower.

In "South ParQ Vaccination Special", Mr. Garrison returns to South Park after losing the 2020 Presidential Election to return to teaching but is shunned by most of the town with the exception of the Whites who are the leaders of a South Park QAnon conspiracy theory group. The Whites and their followers see Garrison as their "chosen one." Garrison pleads to the show's creators to restore him to how things were before he was President; later, the town accepts Mr. Garrison again.

Name history
Mr. Garrison was commonly known as "Mr. Garrison" without a first name until the episode "Cherokee Hair Tampons", when he wrote his book The Valley of the Penises. His name on the cover read as "Ethan Garrison", though this may simply be a pen name. In the episode "The Entity", Mr. Garrison's first name was revealed as "Herbert". As of season 21, he is generally not referred to by name at all, with characters only referring to him as "The President". In Season 23, Randy calls him Mr. Garrison before correcting himself with "Mr. President", reminding viewers that he is still Garrison and not Donald Trump.

Puppet personas

Mr. Hat

Mr. Hat initially appeared to be simply a puppet used by Mr. Garrison as a teaching aid. However, it was soon apparent that Mr. Hat was able to perform activities that would not have been possible if he were merely a puppet. It is not entirely clear how much autonomy Mr. Hat and Mr. Garrison have from each other. In the episode "Chef Aid", Mr. Hat is able to drive a car through a prison wall to rescue Mr. Garrison and Chef, to which Chef remarks, "How the hell did he reach the gas pedal?".

Further evidence of Hat's autonomy includes that Mr. Hat has been able to move his eyes and blink towards Mr. Garrison and Brett Favre, and that in "Worldwide Recorder Concert", where Mr. Hat beats up Mr. Mackey, but also in the South Park video game, where Mr. Hat owns and runs a robot factory by himself, or in South Park: Bigger, Longer & Uncut, when Satan picks up Mr. Hat as a companion to replace Saddam Hussein. Satan speaks Mr. Hat's lines in a voice very similar to Mr. Garrison's.

Mr. Hat is also a racist, as seen in "Chef Goes Nanners", where he is a member of the South Park branch of the Ku Klux Klan. Mr. Hat argues with Mr. Garrison and seemingly disappears to attend a meeting without him. Mr. Hat also appears to be somewhat psychotic. In "Weight Gain 4000", furious at Kathie Lee Gifford for a talent show he and Mr. Garrison had lost years ago, Mr. Hat convinces Mr. Garrison to kill her, which he attempts to do. Again, whether this indicates that Mr. Hat is independent or if Mr. Garrison's own psychosis is simply projected to his puppet is impossible to say.

In a fictional crossover psychotherapy session with Dr. Katz (from another Comedy Central series) in "Summer Sucks", Katz suggests that Mr. Hat was a personification of Mr. Garrison's "gay side". Garrison rejected this, and Katz was never able to counterpoint because he was killed shortly afterward by a gigantic novelty firework. Despite this suggestion, Mr. Garrison retained use of Mr. Hat even after coming out as gay, during the period when both were seen to be teaching kindergarten. Mr. Hat is permanently abandoned in favor of Mr. Slave once Mr. Garrison begins teaching fourth grade.

Parker and Stone have said that the removal of Mr. Hat was symbolic of the show abandoning its original style as a surreal comedy in favor of its current format of satirizing real-life issues and events. Mr. Hat was not seen again until the climax of the episode "200", when Eric Cartman demands to speak with him, at which point Mr. Garrison produces Mr. Hat from a dresser drawer, and despite his initial reluctance, Garrison again seems to illustrate an inability to control Mr. Hat, and again addresses him separately. At the conclusion of the storyline, Mr. Hat is again discarded, subsequently appearing briefly in the game South Park: The Stick of Truth  and the 2021 episode South ParQ Vaccination Special.

Mr. Twig
Mr. Garrison temporarily replaced Mr. Hat with Mr. Twig (starting in the episode "Summer Sucks"), who consisted of a twig wearing a purple shirt with a pink triangle symbol. His voice was identical to Mr. Hat's until his final scene in "Chef Aid", where he spoke with a French accent. Mr. Twig was not well received by the children in Garrison's third grade class, who repeatedly called for the return of Mr. Hat and suggesting Mr. Twig would be better used as a coat rack, to which Garrison took much offense. Eventually, Mr. Hat returns in "Chef Aid", heralding the fact by some psychopathic attacks on Mr. Twig. Though Garrison constantly assured himself that Mr. Twig was a better choice than Mr. Hat, he came to terms with his attachment to Mr. Hat at the end of the episode upon being broken out of jail by him. Garrison got back with Mr. Hat after Mr. Twig advised him to follow his heart.

References

External links

South Park characters
Animated characters introduced in 1997
Animated human characters
Villains in animated television series
Television characters introduced in 1997
Fictional characters from Arkansas
Fictional characters from Colorado
Fictional gay males
Fictional Republicans (United States)
Fictional schoolteachers
Fictional writers
LGBT characters in animation
LGBT characters in animated television series
Fictional activists
Fictional puppeteers
Comedy film characters
Fictional presidents of the United States
Fictional candidates for President of the United States
Fictional characters who break the fourth wall
Fictional LGBT characters in television
Male characters in animated series
 
Fictional LGBT characters in film
Fictional cannibals
Fictional mass murderers
Fictional rapists
Fictional bullies
Fictional criminals
Fictional pedophiles
Fictional characters with psychiatric disorders
Racism in television

hu:South Park-i tanulók és iskolai alkalmazottak#Mr. Garrison
pl:Lista pracowników szkolnych w South Park#Herbert Garrison
Fictional transgender women